Donna Jean Christianson (née Andrae; October 17, 1931 – May 11, 2015) was an American politician, farmer and homemaker.

Born in Pekin, Illinois to Wilbert and Viola (née Strope) Andrae, she was a potato farmer, billing agent, and homemaker in Halstad, Minnesota. Her husband Marvin served in the Minnesota House of Representatives from 1967 until his death in 1969 from cancer. Christianson was elected in a special election succeeding her husband in the Minnesota House of Representatives. Christianson was a Democrat.

Christianson died of cancer and had lived in Fairmont, Minnesota. Her funeral was held at Grace Lutheran Church, Fairmont, and she was buried in Halstad.

References

1931 births
2015 deaths
People from Pekin, Illinois
People from Norman County, Minnesota
Farmers from Minnesota
Women state legislators in Minnesota
Democratic Party members of the Minnesota House of Representatives
Deaths from cancer in Minnesota
People from Fairmont, Minnesota
21st-century American women